William Legge may refer to:

William Legge (Royalist) (1608–1670), British Member of Parliament for Southampton, 1661–1670
William Legge (MP for Portsmouth) (c.1650–c.1697), son of the above, British Member of Parliament for Portsmouth, 1685
William Legge, 1st Earl of Dartmouth (1672–1750), Lord Privy Seal
William Legge, 2nd Earl of Dartmouth (1731–1801), British statesman, Secretary of State for the Colonies 1772–1775
William Legge, 4th Earl of Dartmouth (1784–1853), Fellow of the Royal Society
William Legge, 5th Earl of Dartmouth (1823–1891), Conservative politician
William Legge, 6th Earl of Dartmouth (1851–1936), Conservative politician
William Legge, 7th Earl of Dartmouth (1881–1958), Conservative politician
William Legge, 10th Earl of Dartmouth (born 1949), British peer and politician
William Kaye Legge (1869-1946), senior British Army officer during the First World War
William Vincent Legge (1841–1918), Australian ornithologist
William Legge (bishop) (1913–1999), Canadian Anglican priest

See also
Wilfred Legg (born 1906), South African athlete
Billy Legg (born 1948), English footballer